The Chin Progressive Party (abbreviated CPP) is a Chin political party in Myanmar.

History
The party was formed on 24 March 2010. In the November 2010 general elections it put forward 13 candidates for the House of Nationalities, winning four seats. Two of its seven candidates were elected to the House of Representatives. It also won five seats in the Chin State Hluttaw and one in the Sagaing Region Hluttaw.

References

2010 establishments in Myanmar
political parties established in 2010
political parties in Myanmar